Icing, or frosting, is a sweet, often creamy glaze made of sugar with a liquid, such as water or milk, that is often enriched with ingredients like butter, egg whites, cream cheese, or flavorings. It is used to coat or decorate baked goods, such as cakes. When it is used between layers of cake it is known as a filling.

Icing can be formed into shapes such as flowers and leaves using a pastry bag. Such decorations are commonplace on birthday and wedding cakes. Edible dyes can be added to icing mixtures to achieve a desired hue. Sprinkles, edible inks or other decorations are often used on top of icing.

A basic icing is called a glacé, containing powdered sugar (also known as icing sugar or confectioners' sugar) and water. This can be flavored and colored as desired, for example, by using lemon juice in place of the water.

More complex icings can be made by beating fat into powdered sugar (as in buttercream), by melting fat and sugar together, by using egg whites (as in royal icing), by whipping butter into meringue (as in Italian or Swiss meringue buttercream), and by adding other ingredients such as glycerin (as in fondant).

Some icings can be made from combinations of sugar and cream cheese or sour cream, or by using ground almonds (as in marzipan).

Icing can be applied with a utensil such as a knife or spatula, or it can be applied by drizzling or dipping (see glaze), or by rolling the icing out and draping it over the cake. The method of application largely depends on the type and texture of icing being used.  Icing may be used between layers in a cake as a filling, or it may be used to completely or partially cover the outside of a cake or other baked product.

Apart from its aesthetic functions, icing can also improve the flavour of a cake, as well as preserving it by sealing in moisture.

History

Covering cakes with powdered sugar or other materials was introduced in the 17th century.  The first documented case of frosting occurred in 1655, and included sugar, eggs and rosewater. The icing was applied to the cake then hardened in the oven. The earliest attestation of the verb to ice in this sense seems to date from around 1600, and the noun icing from 1683. Frosting was first attested in 1750.

Gallery

See also
Butter icing
Fondant icing, heated water and sugar, sometimes with gelatin-like stabling
Royal icing, egg white and sugar
Ganache, chocolate and cream
Marzipan, ground almonds and sugar
Cake decorating
Couverture chocolate, a high cocoa butter chocolate
Powdered sugar
Glazing
Meringue

References

Articles containing video clips
Cake decorating
Confectionery